Sternotomis carbonaria is a species of beetle in the family Cerambycidae. It was described by Per Olof Christopher Aurivillius in 1904. It is known from Tanzania, the Democratic Republic of the Congo, and Uganda.

References

Sternotomini
Beetles described in 1904